Patou Kabangu (born 31 December 1985) is a Congolese football midfielder who most recently played for TP Mazembe in the Congolese Linafoot league and DR Congo national football team.

Career
Kabangu was born in Mbuji-Mayi and made his debut for the local football club SM Sanga Balende. In 2007 the fast right winger moved to the Congolese club TP Mazembe. The team won the Congolese championship in 2009. In 2010 TP Mazembe won the final of the CAF Champions League, and qualified for the FIFA Club World Cup. On December 14, 2010 he scored the first goal of the semifinal of 2010 FIFA Club World Cup, where his former club TP Mazembe beat the Brazilian team Sport Club Internacional 2-0.  TP Mazembe was the first team not from Europe or South America to play in the FIFA Club World Cup Final.

In January 2012 he signed for Belgian team Anderlecht, but although he made several substitute appearances and scored a goal, he was released following the 2011-12 season.

On 30 June 2013, Kabangu joined Qatar Stars League side Al Ahli on a three-year deal.

International goals
Scores and results list DR Congo's goal tally first.

|-
| 1. || rowspan=2 | 5 September 2010 || rowspan=2 | Stade Frederic Kibassa Maliba, Lubumbashi || rowspan=2 |  || || rowspan=2 style="text-align:center;" | 2–4 || rowspan=2 | 2012 Africa Cup of Nations qualification
|-
| 2.  || 
|-
| 3. || 5 June 2011 || Stade Anjalay, Belle Vue ||  ||  ||  || 2012 Africa Cup of Nations qualification
|}

Honours
TP Mazembe
 Congolese champions: 2007, 2009
 CAF Champions League: 2009, 2010
 CAF Super Cup: 2010, 2011

References

1985 births
Living people
People from Kasaï-Oriental
Democratic Republic of the Congo footballers
Democratic Republic of the Congo international footballers
Association football midfielders
TP Mazembe players
R.S.C. Anderlecht players
Al Ahli SC (Doha) players
Belgian Pro League players
Expatriate footballers in Belgium
Expatriate footballers in Qatar
Democratic Republic of the Congo expatriate footballers
2013 Africa Cup of Nations players
Democratic Republic of the Congo expatriate sportspeople in Belgium
Qatar Stars League players
Democratic Republic of the Congo A' international footballers
2011 African Nations Championship players
Democratic Republic of the Congo expatriate sportspeople in Qatar